Dorothy Vernell Simmons (1910–1996) was the founder and singer for the Los Angeles-based Gospel act the Simmons-Akers Singers.

Biography
Simmons was born in Powhatan, Louisiana in 1910. Her family moved to Chicago when Simmons was seven year old. After she graduated from high school she went to work for the Martin and Morris Music Company. In 1940 Simmons became a member of the Sallie Martin Singers. She moved to Los Angeles in 1947.

In 1948, she and Doris Akers (1923-1995) formed the Simmons-Akers Singers. Their music played a part in the expanding Los Angeles gospel movement and emphasized melody and a smooth sound. Simmons sang soprano and Akers sang mezzo-soprano-alto.

Simmons died in 1996.

References

External links
Meet Me in the Glory Land audio file of the Simmons-Akers Singers

1875 births
1952 deaths
American gospel singers
20th-century African-American women singers
People from Louisiana